("founders' period") was the economic phase in 19th-century Germany and Austria before the great stock market crash of 1873. In Central Europe, the age of industrialisation had been taking place since the 1840s. That period is not precisely dated, but in Austria, the March Revolution of 1848 is generally accepted as the beginning of economic changes, in contrast to political reforms. In Germany, as a consequence of the large influx of capital resulting from French war reparations from the Franco-Prussian War of 1870–1871 and the subsequent unification of Germany, an economic boom then gave rise to the description of these years as the "entrepreneurs' years".

These years in Central Europe saw citizens increasingly influence cultural development. The time was also one of classical liberalism, even if the political demands of the time were only partially met. Industrialisation also posed aesthetic challenges, above all in the fields of architecture and craftsmanship, through development of existing forms.

In common language, the term  is often mingled with Historicism, which was the predominant architectural style after 1850 until 1914, which led to a blurring of the terms. In historical context, different decades are often also called Gründerzeit. For that reason, the term Gründerzeit is used to refer to several periods, such as 1850–1873, 1871–1890, sometimes 1850–1914 in reference to the architecture, or just 1871–1873.

Economy 

The German term  refers to the great economic upswing in the mid-19th century, when the founders of businesses (meaning entrepreneurs) could apparently become rich overnight. Of particular importance for speedy economic development was the rise of a developed railway system. The railway was then a major factor in its own right on the business scene, and it also permitted further development through improved communication and migration. Rural migration to the cities assisted the development of a proletariat, with an attendant increase in social problems.

The stock market crash of 1873, combined with economic overheating due to enormous French reparations from the war, put an abrupt end to the upswing, which was referred to as the Founders' Crisis and resulted in a 20 years of economic stagnation. The crisis caused the theory of economic liberalism to lose ground, and it also led to introduction of mechanisms of business control, as well as protective customs tariffs.

The Vienna stock market crash led to the Panic of 1873 in the United States, which resulted in the Long Depression.

Design and architecture 

The need for housing rose in consequence of industrialisation. Complete housing developments in the so-called Founding Epoch Architecture style arose in previously green fields, and even today, Central European cities have many buildings from the time together along a single road or even in complete districts. The buildings have four to six stories and were often built by private property developers. They often sported richly-decorated façades in the form of Historicism such as Gothic Revival, Renaissance Revival, German Renaissance and Baroque Revival. Magnificent palaces for nouveau-riche citizens but also infamous rental housing for the expanding urban lower classes were built.

The period was also important for the integration of new technologies in architecture and design. A determining factor was the development of the Bessemer process in steel production, which made possible the construction of steel façades. A classical example of the new form is the steel and glass construction of the Crystal Palace, completed in 1851, which was then revolutionary and inspired subsequent decades.

In Austria 
In Austria, the Gründerzeit began after 1840 with the industrialisation of Vienna, as well as the regions of Bohemia and Moravia. Liberalism reached its zenith in Austria in 1867 in Austria-Hungary and remained dominant until the mid-1870s.

Vienna, the imperial capital and the residence of Emperor Franz Joseph, after the failed uprising of 1848 became the fourth-largest city in the world with the inclusion of suburbs and an influx of new residents from other regions of Austria. Where the city wall had once stood, a ring road was built, and ambitious civic buildings, including the Opera House, Town Hall, and Parliament, were also built. In contrast to agricultural workers and urban labourers, an increasingly-wealthy upper-middle class installed monuments and mansions. That occurred on a smaller scale in other cities such as Graz but on the periphery, which preserved the old city from destructive redevelopment.

In Germany 
In the mindset of many Germans, the epoch is intrinsically linked with Kaiser Wilhelm I and Chancellor Bismarck, but it did not end with them (in 1888 and 1890, respectively) but continued well into the reign of Kaiser Wilhelm II. It was a Golden Age for Germany in which the disasters of the Thirty Years' War and the Napoleonic Wars were remedied, and the country competed internationally in the areas of science, technology, industry and commerce. Particularly, the German middle class rapidly increased its standard of living, buying modern furniture, kitchen fittings and household machines.

In German-speaking areas, a huge number of publications were produced that was comparable, on a per-capita basis, to modern levels. Most were academic papers or scientific and technical publications, often practical instruction manuals on topics such as dike construction. There was no copyright law in most countries except in the United Kingdom. Since popular works were immediately republished by competitors, publishers needed a constant stream of new material. Fees paid to authors for new works were high and significantly supplemented the incomes of many academics. The prices of reprints were low and so publications could be bought by poorer people. A widespread public obsession with reading led to the rapid autodidactic dissemination of new knowledge to a broader audience. After copyright law gradually became established in the 1840s, the low-price mass market vanished, and fewer but more expensive editions were published.

The social effects of industrialisation were the same as in other European nations. Increased agricultural efficiency and introduction of new agricultural machines led to a polarized distribution of income in the countryside. The landowners won out to the disadvantage of the agrarian unpropertied workforce. Emigration, most of it to America, and urbanisation were consequences.

In the rapidly-growing industrial cities, new workers' dwellings were erected, lacking in comfort by today's standards but criticised even then as unhealthy by physicians: "without light, air and sun", they were quite contrary to the prevailing ideas on town planning. The dark, cramped flats took much of the blame for the marked increase in tuberculosis, which spread also to wealthier neighbourhoods.

Nevertheless, the working class also saw improvements of living standards and other conditions, such as social security through laws on workers' health insurance and accident insurance introduced by Bismarck in 1883–1884, and in the long run also through the foundation of a social democracy that would remain the model for the European sister parties until Hitler's Machtübernahme in 1933. Even today, the model of social care developed by Bismarck in 1873 (Reichsversicherungsordnung) remains the contractual basis for health insurance in Germany.

References

Further reading

External links 
 

19th century in art
19th century in Germany
Architectural styles
Historical eras
Interior design